Marcelo Daniel Rolón Figueredo (born 21 July 1984 in Asunción, Paraguay) is a Paraguayan naturalized Chilean former footballer who played as a midfielder.

Teams
  Victoria  2001–2002
  Sol de América 2003
  Palestino 2004
  Fernández Vial 2005
  Magallanes 2006
  Deportes Temuco 2007
  Deportes Copiapó 2008
  Municipal Iquique 2009
  Rangers 2010
  Independiente Campo Grande 2011

External links
 
 
 Marcelo Rolón at PlaymakerStats.com

1984 births
Living people
Paraguayan footballers
Paraguayan expatriate footballers
Paraguayan emigrants to Chile
Naturalized citizens of Chile
Paraguayan Primera División players
Club Sol de América footballers
Independiente F.B.C. footballers
Chilean Primera División players
Primera B de Chile players
Club Deportivo Palestino footballers
C.D. Arturo Fernández Vial footballers
Deportes Magallanes footballers
Deportes Temuco footballers
Deportes Copiapó footballers
Deportes Iquique footballers
Rangers de Talca footballers
Magallanes footballers
Paraguayan expatriate sportspeople in Chile
Expatriate footballers in Chile
Association football midfielders